Doneraile was a constituency represented in the Irish House of Commons until 1800.
Doneraile is in County Cork, Republic of Ireland.

History
In the Patriot Parliament of 1689 summoned by James II, Doneraile was represented with two members.

Daniel O'Donovan of Mahoonagh and Feenagh was a Member of James II's 1689-92 Patriot Parliament who represented the Manor of Doneraile.

Members of Parliament, 1640–1801

1689–1801

Notes

References

Bibliography

Johnston-Liik, E. M. (2002). History of the Irish Parliament, 1692–1800, Publisher: Ulster Historical Foundation (28 Feb 2002),  
 T. W. Moody, F. X. Martin, F. J. Byrne, A New History of Ireland 1534-1691, Oxford University Press, 1978
 Tim Cadogan and Jeremiah Falvey, A Biographical Dictionary of Cork, 2006, Four Courts Press 

Constituencies of the Parliament of Ireland (pre-1801)
Historic constituencies in County Cork
1640 establishments in Ireland
1800 disestablishments in Ireland
Constituencies established in 1640
Constituencies disestablished in 1800